The 1984 San Francisco Giants season was the Giants' 102nd season in Major League Baseball, their 27th season in San Francisco since their move from New York following the 1957 season, and their 25th at Candlestick Park. The team finished in sixth place in the National League West with a 66–96 record, 26 games behind the San Diego Padres.

Offseason 
 December 5, 1983: Fran Mullins was drafted by the Giants from the Cincinnati Reds in the 1983 rule 5 draft.
 December 6, 1983: Champ Summers was traded by the Giants to the San Diego Padres for Joe Pittman and a player to be named later. The Padres completed the deal by sending Tommy Francis (minors) to the Giants on December 7.
 December 20, 1983: Manny Trillo was signed as a free agent by the Giants.
 January 17, 1984: Mackey Sasser was drafted by the Giants in the 5th round of the 1984 Major League Baseball draft.
 February 8, 1984: Pat Larkin was traded by the Giants to the Detroit Tigers for Colin Ward.
 February 27, 1984: Max Venable, Fred Breining and a player to be named later were traded by the Giants to the Montreal Expos for Al Oliver. The Giants completed the deal by sending Andy McGaffigan to the Expos on March 31.
 March 28, 1984: Gene Richards was signed as a free agent by the Giants.

Regular season

Season standings

Record vs. opponents

Opening Day starters 
Bob Brenly
Jack Clark
Chili Davis
Mark Davis
Johnnie LeMaster
Jeffrey Leonard
Al Oliver
Manny Trillo
Joel Youngblood

Notable transactions 
 June 4, 1984: 1984 Major League Baseball draft
Terry Mulholland was drafted by the Giants in the 1st round (24th pick).
Mike Blowers was drafted by the Giants in the 2nd round of the Secondary Phase, but did not sign.
 August 20, 1984: Al Oliver and a player to be named later were traded by the Giants to the Philadelphia Phillies for Kelly Downs and George Riley. The Giants completed the deal by sending Renie Martin to the Phillies on August 30.

Roster

Game log

Regular season

|-style=background:#fbb
| 1 || April 3 || || Cubs || 3–5 || || || || || || 0–1 || L1
|-style=background:#fbb
| 2 || April 5 || || Cubs || 7–11 || || || || || || 0–2 || L2
|-style=background:#fbb
| 11 || April 17 || || Padres || 1–2 || || || || || || 4–7 || L1
|-style=background:#bbb
| — || April 18 || || Padres || colspan=8 | Postponed (Rain) (Makeup date: September 24)
|-style=background:#fbb
| 16 || April 23 || || @ Padres || 2–8 || || || || || || 7–9 || L1
|-style=background:#fbb
| 17 || April 24 || || @ Padres || 1–6 || || || || || || 7–10 || L2
|-style=background:#fbb
| 18 || April 25 || || @ Padres || 0–3 || || || || || || 7–11 || L3
|-

|-style=background:#fbb
| 29 || May 7 || || @ Cubs || 7–10 || || || || || || 11–18 || L1
|-style=background:#fbb
| 30 || May 8 || || @ Cubs || 11–12 || || || || || || 11–19 || L2
|-

|-style=background:#cfc
| 46 || June 1 || || Padres || 11–7 || || || || || || 17–29 || W1
|-style=background:#fbb
| 47 || June 2 || || Padres || 2–3  || || || || || || 17–30 || L1
|-style=background:#fbb
| 48 || June 3 || || Padres || 5–7 || || || || || || 17–31 || L2
|-style=background:#fbb
| 49 || June 3 || || Padres || 6–7 || || || || || || 17–32 || L3
|-style=background:#cfc
| 60 || June 14 || || @ Padres || 5–2 || || || || || || 22–38 || W2
|-style=background:#fbb
| 61 || June 15 || || @ Padres || 2–3 || || || || || || 22–39 || L1
|-style=background:#cfc
| 62 || June 16 || || @ Padres || 6–3 || || || || || || 23–39 || W1
|-style=background:#cfc
| 63 || June 17 || || @ Padres || 5–3  || || || || || || 24–39 || W2
|-

|-style=background:#fbb
| 80 || July 5 || || Cubs || 3–9 || || || || || || 32–48 || L3
|-style=background:#fbb
| 81 || July 6 || || Cubs || 4–5 || || || || || || 32–49 || L4
|-style=background:#cfc
| 82 || July 7 || || Cubs || 7–2 || || || || || || 33–49 || W1
|-style=background:#fbb
| 83 || July 8 || || Cubs || 3–6 || || || || || || 33–50 || L1
|-style=background:#bbbfff
|colspan="12"|55th All-Star Game in San Francisco, CA
|-style=background:#fbb
| 92 || July 19 || || @ Cubs || 4–6 || || || || || || 35–57 || L2
|-style=background:#cfc
| 93 || July 20 || || @ Cubs || 3–2 || || || || || || 36–57 || W1
|-style=background:#fbb
| 94 || July 21 || || @ Cubs || 3–4  || || || || || || 36–58 || L1
|-style=background:#cfc
| 95 || July 22 || || @ Cubs || 11–5 || || || || || || 37–58 || W1
|-

|-

|-style=background:#fbb
| 151 || September 19 || || @ Padres || 4–5  || || || || || || 62–89 || L5
|-style=background:#fbb
| 152 || September 20 || || @ Padres || 4–5 || || || || || || 62–90 || L6
|-style=background:#fbb
| 156 || September 24 || || Padres || 1–7 || || || || || || 65–91 || L1
|-style=background:#fbb
| 157 || September 24 || || Padres || 6–8  || || || || || || 65–92 || L2
|-style=background:#cfc
| 158 || September 25 || || Padres || 4–3 || || || || || || 66–92 || W1
|-style=background:#fbb
| 159 || September 26 || || Padres || 0–4 || || || || || || 66–93 || L1
|-

|- style="text-align:center;"
| Legend:       = Win       = Loss       = PostponementBold = Giants team member

Player stats

Batting

Starters by position 
Note: Pos = Position; G = Games played; AB = At bats; H = Hits; Avg. = Batting average; HR = Home runs; RBI = Runs batted in

Other batters 
Note: G = Games played; AB = At bats; H = Hits; Avg. = Batting average; HR = Home runs; RBI = Runs batted in

Pitching

Starting pitchers 
Note: G = Games pitched; IP = Innings pitched; W = Wins; L = Losses; ERA = Earned run average; SO = Strikeouts

Other pitchers 
Note: G = Games pitched; IP = Innings pitched; W = Wins; L = Losses; ERA = Earned run average; SO = Strikeouts

Relief pitchers 
Note: G = Games pitched; W = Wins; L = Losses; SV = Saves; ERA = Earned run average; SO = Strikeouts

Awards and honors 
 Bob Brenly, Willie Mac Award
All-Star Game

Farm system

References

External links
 1984 San Francisco Giants team at Baseball-Reference
 1984 San Francisco Giants team page at Baseball Almanac

San Francisco Giants seasons
San Francisco Giants season
1984 in San Francisco
San